is an anime series, adapted from the manga of the same name by Clamp. The series was adapted by Madhouse and directed by Morio Asaka with music by K-Taro Takanami and character designs by Hisashi Abe. The opening theme is "Let Me Be With You" by Round Table featuring Nino.

The series was broadcast in 26 episodes from 2 April 2002 to 24 September 2002 across Japan, East Asia, and Southeast Asia by the anime satellite television network, Animax and the terrestrial Tokyo Broadcasting System network. Elsewhere in the world, the series was rebroadcast in Korea by AniOne TV, in France by Europe 2 TV, in Spain by both Animax España and Buzz Channel, in Portugal on Animax Portugal, and in Poland by Hyper. It was later released in Japan across 8 DVDs. The original episodes 9 and 18 are "recap" episodes, summarizing previous events. These episodes were re-numbered for the DVD release as episodes 8.5 and 16.5, respectively, and removed from their original sequence by being published together on the final DVD. As a result, the series is 24 episodes long. In addition, there are two DVD-only OVAs: a 27th episode recapping the series (numbered episode 24.5) and a 6-minute special. The ending theme of the latter is "Book End Bossa" by Round Table featuring Nino.

The series was licensed in North America by Geneon, who released the series across 7 DVDs between 11 March 2003 and 9 March 2004 and as a complete boxset on 8 November 2005. In the UK the series was licensed by MVM Films and released on six discs between 21 March 2005 and 10 April 2006. A complete boxset was released on 5 March 2007. In Australian and New Zealand it was released by Madman Entertainment. It is also licensed in Taiwan by Proware Multimedia, in France and the Netherlands by Kazé, in Germany by ADV Films even though it's no longer licensed since the company's shutdown, and in Russia by MC Entertainment.



Episodes

Unaired episodes (DVD/Blu-Ray exclusives)

References

Chobits
Chobits